The Armenian Diving Federation, is the regulating body of diving in Armenia, governed by the Armenian Olympic Committee. The headquarters of the federation is located in Yerevan.

History
The Federation is currently led by president Gabriel Ghazaryan. The Federation oversees the training of diving specialists. Armenian diving athletes participate in various European and international level diving competitions, including diving at the Summer Olympics. The Armenian Diving Championships are organized by the Federation.

See also
 Armenian Swimming Federation
 Sport in Armenia
 Water Polo Federation of Armenia

References 

Sports governing bodies in Armenia
Diving in Armenia
Diving (sport) organizations